Charles Collett (1871–1952) was a British railway engineer.

Charles Collett may also refer to:

Charles E. Collett (1903–1968), American lawyer
Charles Elmer Collett (born 1944), firefighter and American football player
Sir Charles Collett, 1st Baronet (1864–1938), of the Collett baronets

See also
Charles Collet (1888–1915), British naval airman
Charles Collette (1842–1924), actor and composer
Charles Hastings Collette (1816–1901), British solicitor and writer
Collett (disambiguation)